Freeman Estate, also known as Park Hill Farm, is a historic home located at Huntington, Cabell County, West Virginia. The estate house was built between 1912 and 1914 and is a -story, masonry American Craftsman-style dwelling.  It measures  and has a red, clay-tile roof. 

Also, the property has a contributing stone wall and cobblestone path dated to the construction of the house.

It was listed on the National Register of Historic Places in 2009.

References

Houses on the National Register of Historic Places in West Virginia
American Craftsman architecture in West Virginia
Houses completed in 1914
Houses in Huntington, West Virginia
National Register of Historic Places in Cabell County, West Virginia
Bungalow architecture in West Virginia